Acontista multicolor is a small species of South American mantis in the family Acanthopidae.

References

Acanthopidae
Mantodea of South America
Insects described in 1870